Milton Enoch Daniel (October 6, 1890 – April 16, 1958) was an American independent oil operator, college football player and coach, and an important figure in the history of Texas Christian University (TCU). He played football at TCU, from 1908 to 1911, and one season at the University of Texas at Austin, in 1913. In 1916, he returned to TCU to serve as the head football coach for two seasons, from 1916 to 1917, compiling a record of 14–4–1. He was a generous donor to the University and served as the chairmen of its board of directors until his retirement in 1957. Milton Daniel Hall on the TCU campus is named in his honor, as is the Daniel-Meyer Athletic Complex.

Early life, education, and playing career
Daniel was born on October 6, 1890, in Farmerville, Louisiana. He was the fourth son of Lawrence C. Daniel and Sarah Ada Burk. At the age of four, Daniel moved with this family to Waco, Texas. Following the death of his mother when he was 10, Daniel and two brothers spent a short time in a Methodist orphanage before coming under the guardianship of a cousin, E. E. Cammack, in Waco.

When Daniel was 16, he left for Texas Christian University (TCU) for prep school and then enrolled in the college in 1908. He lettered four times in both football and baseball at TCU, captaining the 1911 TCU Horned Frogs football team. In 1912, Daniel moved on to the University of Texas at Austin, where he lettered for the Texas Longhorns football team in 1913 and earned a Bachelor of Laws degree.

Head coaching record

References

External links
 

1890 births
1958 deaths
American football fullbacks
TCU Horned Frogs baseball players
TCU Horned Frogs football coaches
TCU Horned Frogs football players
Texas Longhorns football players
Texas Christian University faculty
People from Farmerville, Louisiana
Sportspeople from Waco, Texas
Players of American football from Texas
Baseball players from Texas
Texas lawyers
20th-century American lawyers